Judith Skelton Grant (born 1941) is a Canadian writer, editor and biographer.

Grant is best known for her editing of collections by novelist, playwright, critic, journalist, and professor Robertson Davies, as well as her biography of Davies, Robertson Davies: Man of Myth.  She most recently wrote "A Meeting of Minds: The Massey College Story", a history of the college where Davies served as the first Master.

Selected bibliography

As author
 The Nature of Duty and the Problem of Passion in the Works of George Eliot — 1974
 Mavis Gallant and Her Works — 1989. 
 Robertson Davies: Man of Myth, Viking, Toronto, 1994.  (hard cover);  (paperback)
 A Meeting of Minds: The Massey College Story, University of Toronto Press, Toronto, 2015.

As editor
 The Enthusiasms of Robertson Davies — 1979; revised 1990. 
 The Well-Tempered Critic: One man's view of theatre and letters in Canada — 1981. 
 For Your Eye Alone: Letters 1976-1995 — 1999. 
 Discoveries: Early letters 1938-1975 — 2002. 

1941 births
Living people